Harry L. Williams is an American businessman who is the president and CEO of the Thurgood Marshall College Fund (TMCF), which is an organization of America's 47 publicly-supported historically black colleges and universities (HBCUs) and predominately black institutions (PBIs) representing nearly 300,000 students across the country. Williams has held several senior leadership positions within the University of North Carolina General Administration, Appalachian State University, North Carolina A&T State University, Delaware State University. He is married to Robin S. Williams and is the father of two sons.

Early life and education 
Williams was born and raised in Greenville, North Carolina. Williams is a graduate of Appalachian State University where he earned two degrees, a B.S. in Communication Broadcasting and his M.A. in Educational Media. Additionally, Williams earned his Ed.D. in Educational Leadership and Policy Analysis from East Tennessee State University.

Career

Delaware State University (DSU) 
Williams was president of Delaware State University (DSU) for eight years. At DSU, Williams increased student enrollment at the HBCU, which included DACA students. Additionally, Williams executed a $20 million "Greater Than One Campaign for Students" campaign in five years at DSU.

Thurgood Marshall College Fund (TMCF) 
In 2017,T MCF announced Williams had been selected by the TMCF board of directors to be the next president and CEO at the 30th Anniversary Awards Gala. Under the leadership of Williams TMCF announced partnerships with the Boeing Company, Strada Education Network, and Honda North America. In 2018, TMCF announced it had given over $3.3 million in student scholarships and raised over $5.6 million at their 31st Anniversary Awards Gala with Williams as host.

Opinion writer 
Williams writes opinion-editorials in his role as TMCF president & CEO on issues such as higher education, diversity, partnerships, HBCU sustainability, and advocacy.

Awards and honors 
Williams was awarded the National TRIO Achiever Award, TMCF's Education Leadership Award, and HBCU Digest's “Top 10 Most Influential HBCU Presidents."

References 

Year of birth missing (living people)
Living people
American chief executives
Appalachian State University alumni
East Tennessee State University alumni